Martin Bogatinov (born 26 April 1986) is a Macedonian footballer who plays as a goalkeeper for Cypriot First Division club Ethnikos Achna.

Club career
In 2010, Bogatinov was named Macedonia's domestic footballer of the year. Between 2014 and 2015, Bogatinov played for Ermis Aradippou FC in the Cypriot First Division.

International career 
He made his senior debut for  Macedonia in a November 2010 friendly match away against Albania and has earned a total of 18 caps, scoring no goals. His final international was an October 2016 FIFA World Cup qualification match against Italy in Skopje. 
So after 3 years he was absent from his national team, he had called up again for UEFA Nations League in September 2020 against Armenia national football team and Georgia national football team.

Honours
FK Vardar
 Macedonian Cup:  2006–07

FK Teteks
Macedonian Vtora Liga: 2008–09
Macedonian Cup: 2009–10

Steaua București
Romanian Liga I: 2013–14

Fk Orovnik
Macedonian Selska Liga I: 2013–14

Individual
First Macedonian Football League Player of the Year (1): 2010

References

External links
 
 Profile at MacedonianFootball.com 

1986 births
Living people
People from Kratovo, North Macedonia
Association football goalkeepers
Macedonian footballers
North Macedonia international footballers
FK Sileks players
FK Cementarnica 55 players
FK Vardar players
FK Teteks players
FK Rabotnički players
FC Karpaty Lviv players
FC Steaua București players
Ermis Aradippou FC players
Ethnikos Achna FC players
Macedonian First Football League players
Ukrainian Premier League players
Liga I players
Cypriot First Division players
Cypriot Second Division players
Macedonian expatriate footballers
Expatriate footballers in Ukraine
Macedonian expatriate sportspeople in Ukraine
Expatriate footballers in Romania
Macedonian expatriate sportspeople in Romania
Expatriate footballers in Cyprus
Macedonian expatriate sportspeople in Cyprus